James Thomas Grandholm (born October 4, 1960) is an American former professional basketball player who played in the National Basketball Association (NBA) and other leagues.

Grandholm, a 7'0" center, played college basketball for the University of Florida from 1979 to 1980, and at the University of South Florida from 1981 to 1984. He was selected in the 1984 NBA draft by the Washington Bullets with the 76th overall pick (fourth round), but did not play in the NBA until he was 30 years old, when he joined the Dallas Mavericks in 1990–91 for one season. He played 168 minutes over 26 games, averaging three points, 1.9 rebounds per game, and made 9 of his 17 three-point shot attempts (52.9%)..He signed briefly with the Orlando Magic but was waived prior to the start of the 1989–90 season.

During the late 1980s and early 1990s, Grandholm played professionally in Italy.

References

External links
College & NBA stats @ basketballreference.com
Jim Grandholm photo
Player profile 

1960 births
Living people
American expatriate basketball people in France
American expatriate basketball people in Italy
American expatriate basketball people in Switzerland
American men's basketball players
AMG Sebastiani Basket players
Basketball players from Indiana
Centers (basketball)
Dallas Mavericks players
Florida Gators men's basketball players
JDA Dijon Basket players
People from Elkhart, Indiana
Sarasota Stingers players
South Florida Bulls men's basketball players
Vevey Riviera Basket players
Washington Bullets draft picks